Omer Vermeulen (24 November 1895 – 27 January 1980) was a Belgian racing cyclist. He rode in the 1926 Tour de France.

References

1895 births
1980 deaths
Belgian male cyclists